Jim Raussen is a former Republican member of the Ohio House of Representatives, representing the 29th District from 2003 to 2008.

References

External links

Living people
Republican Party members of the Ohio House of Representatives
21st-century American politicians
People from Springdale, Ohio
Year of birth missing (living people)